Kristofer Cole Wright (born July 17, 1994) is an American professional stock car racing driver. He competes full-time in the NASCAR Craftsman Truck Series, driving the No. 02 Chevrolet Silverado for Young's Motorsports. He has also previously competed in sports car racing, open-wheel racing, the Euroformula Open Championship, the NASCAR Xfinity Series, ARCA Menards Series, ARCA Menards Series East and ARCA Menards Series West. Wright is also the 2018 IMSA Prototype Challenge LMP3 class champion.

Racing career

Sports car racing
In 2015, he joined Kinetic Motorsports in the Pirelli World Challenge Touring Car A class. He recorded his first podium finish at Miller Motorsports Park where he finished third.

In 2017, he raced in the IMSA Prototype Challenge with JDC MotorSports. Wright, who described the prototype cars as "really easy to drive", finished second in the Prototype Challenge standings with a win at Watkins Glen International and Rookie of the Year honors. He signed with Extreme Speed Motorsports for the 2018 Prototype Challenge season, during which he scored race wins at Barber Motorsports Park and Virginia International Raceway, finished in podium range in all six events, and won the LMP3 class championship.

Wright ran his first endurance and WeatherTech SportsCar Championship race at the 2019 24 Hours of Daytona, driving for Performance Tech Motorsports in the LMP2 class. Joined by Kyle Masson, Robert Masson, and Cameron Cassels in the No. 38, Wright's team finished second in its class.

Open-wheel racing
During the 2017 racing season, Wright entered the Road to Indy ladder beginning with the U.S. F2000 National Championship with John Cummiskey Racing. He raced at the Grand Prix of St. Petersburg, Barber, and the Indianapolis Motor Speedway road course before moving to the Pro Mazda Championship in June with JDC. He contested the Road America, Mid-Ohio Sports Car Course, and Watkins Glen races, with a best finish of fifth at Watkins Glen.

In 2019, he started racing in the BRDC British Formula 3 Championship with Fortec Motorsports after testing with the team the previous year; Wright compared the car to the Pro Mazda vehicles, noting they were "very similar". He finished the season 16th in points, last among drivers who ran the full schedule, with a best finish of fifth at Silverstone Circuit.

Wright remained with Fortec as he moved to the Euroformula Open Championship in 2020, though the season's start was impacted by the COVID-19 pandemic.

Stock car racing
Wright's first starts in stock car racing took place during summer 2020. In June, he raced in the ARCA Menards Series West doubleheader at Utah Motorsports Campus, where he finished second and third.

In August, he joined the GMS Racing organization, racing in the ARCA Menards Series and the NASCAR Gander RV & Outdoors Truck Series on a part-time basis. His debut with the team came on August 1 in the CARS Super Late Model Tour at Hickory Motor Speedway, where he finished 11th. His first ARCA and NASCAR Truck starts for GMS took place at Michigan International Speedway and the Daytona International Speedway road course, respectively.

Wright joined Young's Motorsports for the full 2021 NASCAR Truck Series season, driving the No. 02; he also debuted the team's ARCA program at the Daytona test in January. After running the season opener, he also signed with NASCAR Xfinity Series team Sam Hunt Racing as a road course ringer. Wright missed the Atlanta Motor Speedway race in March after testing positive for COVID-19.

For 2022, Wright will drive the No. 44 Niece Motorsports Chevrolet full-time, but would later leave the team on August. However, Wright was announced to run the rest of the Xfinity Series season with Brandonbilt Motorsports from August onwards, only excluding three races which owner Brandon Brown himself will drive, and the car having sponsorship from FNB Corporation.

On February 8, 2023, it was announced that Wright would return to the same truck he drove in 2021, the No. 02 for Young's Motorsports and run full-time in the Truck Series in 2023.

Personal life
Wright's father was also a racing driver, though he encouraged his son to play golf. After graduating from Central Catholic High School in Pittsburgh in 2013, Wright was a member of IMG Academy and Robert Morris University's golf teams. He also qualified for the district championship of the Remax World Long Drive Championship in 2014 but sadly came up short on his bid for the World Finals.

Motorsports career results

NASCAR
(key) (Bold – Pole position awarded by qualifying time. Italics – Pole position earned by points standings or practice time. * – Most laps led.)

Xfinity Series

Craftsman Truck Series

 Season still in progress
 Ineligible for series points

ARCA Menards Series
(key) (Bold – Pole position awarded by qualifying time. Italics – Pole position earned by points standings or practice time. * – Most laps led.)

ARCA Menards Series East

ARCA Menards Series West

References

External links
 
 

Living people
1994 births
ARCA Menards Series drivers
BRDC British Formula 3 Championship drivers
IMG Academy alumni
NASCAR drivers
People from Allegheny County, Pennsylvania
Robert Morris Colonials athletes
WeatherTech SportsCar Championship drivers
Indy Pro 2000 Championship drivers
U.S. F2000 National Championship drivers
24 Hours of Daytona drivers
JDC Motorsports drivers
Extreme Speed Motorsports drivers
Fortec Motorsport drivers
Michelin Pilot Challenge drivers
HMD Motorsports drivers
Porsche Carrera Cup Germany drivers